The International Journal of Palliative Nursing is a monthly peer-reviewed medical journal covering palliative care nursing. It was established in 1995 and is published by the Mark Allen Group. The editor-in-chief is  Brian Nyatanga (of the University of Worcester). The journal is abstracted and indexed in CINAHL, Emerging Sources Citation Index, MEDLINE/PubMed, and Scopus.

References

External links
 

Anesthesiology and palliative medicine journals
Publications established in 1995
Monthly journals
English-language journals